The Portree Hospital is a health facility in Fancyhill, Portree on the Isle of Skye. It is managed by NHS Highland.

History  
The facility, which was commissioned to replace the old Ross Memorial Hospital in Portree, opened in 1964. An outpatients department was added in 1965 and the whole hospital was enlarged by adding an extra storey in 2007. A report prepared by Sir Lewis Ritchie, published in May 2018, recommended that the hospital continue to offer inpatient services and out-of-hours care.

References 

NHS Highland
Hospitals in Highland (council area)
Buildings and structures in the Isle of Skye
NHS Scotland hospitals
Hospital buildings completed in 1964
Hospitals established in 1964
1964 establishments in Scotland
Portree